Roque Ezequiel Ovejero (born 19 July 1994) is an Argentine professional footballer who plays as a midfielder.

Career
Ovejero started with All Boys. Having initially been selected as an unused substitute in the 2014 Primera B Nacional against Sarmiento, Ovejero made his senior debut three seasons later in 2016–17 after featuring for the full duration of a penalty shoot-out loss to Atlético Tucumán in the Copa Argentina in June 2017; he later played in the league versus Guillermo Brown in the following month. Just one further appearance followed in the subsequent campaign, before Ovejero appeared more regularly in 2018–19 with eleven of his opening fifteen matches coming as a starter; in Primera B Metropolitana after 2017–18 relegation.

Career statistics
.

References

External links

1994 births
Living people
People from La Matanza Partido
Argentine footballers
Association football midfielders
Primera Nacional players
Primera B Metropolitana players
All Boys footballers
Sportspeople from Buenos Aires Province